Below is a list of dishes found in Jewish cuisine.

Traditional Ashkenazi dishes
Ashkenazi Jews are the Jews descended from the medieval Jewish communities of the Rhineland in the west of Germany. Ashkenazim or Ashkenazi Jews are literally referring to "German Jews." Many Ashkenazi Jews later migrated, largely eastward, forming communities in non German-speaking areas, including Bohemia (Czech Republic), Hungary, Poland, Lithuania, Latvia, Russia, Ukraine, Romania, Belarus, and elsewhere between the 10th and 19th centuries. As many of these countries share similar dishes, and were occupied by the Russian and Austro-Hungarian Empires until the end of World War I, the place where the dish originated is uncertain.

Sephardi and Mizrahi dishes
This section makes reference to the cuisine of the Jews from the Mediterranean and the Middle East.

Sephardim are a subgroup of Jews originating in the Iberian Peninsula (modern Spain and Portugal). After being expelled from Spain and Portugal, they resettled in the Mediterranean basin, most prominently in Turkey, Greece, Morocco and Algeria.

Mizrahim is an umbrella term for the Judeo-Arabic and Judeo-Persian speaking Jewish communities from the Middle East, North Africa and Central Asia. Although Mizrahi Jews are not descended from the Jews expelled from the Iberian Peninsula, they are also called Sephardi to contrast them to the Ashkenazi culture and religious rites. 

As in the case of Ashkenazi cuisine, the place of birth of the recipes of the Sephardi and Mizrahi cuisine is generally uncertain.

See also

 Cuisine of the Sephardic Jews
 Israeli cuisine
 Jewish cuisine
 Jewish deli
 Kashrut, Jewish dietary laws
 Kosher foods
 Kosher restaurant
 List of kosher restaurants
 List of foods with religious symbolism

References

External links

 
Jewish